Zoran Gajić (born 18 May 1990) is a Serbian professional footballer who plays as a defender.

Career
On 29 June 2021, Gajić signed for Pyunik, leaving the club on 25 December 2022 when his contract expired.

Honours
Pyunik
 Armenian Premier League: 2021–22

References

External links
 Profile at FC Zbrojovka Brno official site
 

1990 births
Living people
Serbian footballers
FK Voždovac players
FK BSK Borča players
Bohemians 1905 players
FC Zbrojovka Brno players
FC Fastav Zlín players
FC Arda Kardzhali players
First Professional Football League (Bulgaria) players
Expatriate footballers in Bulgaria
Association football defenders